The 1981 FIBA Europe Under-16 Championship (known at that time as 1981 European Championship for Cadets) was the 6th edition of the FIBA Europe Under-16 Championship. The cities of Thessaloniki and Katerini, in Greece, hosted the tournament. The Soviet Union won the trophy for the third time and became the most winning country in the tournament.

Teams

Preliminary round
The twelve teams were allocated in two groups of six teams each.

Group A

Group B

Knockout stage

9th–12th playoffs

5th–8th playoffs

Championship

Final standings

References
FIBA Archive
FIBA Europe Archive

FIBA U16 European Championship
1981–82 in European basketball
1981 in Greek sport
International youth basketball competitions hosted by Greece
August 1981 sports events in Europe